Jeffrey Vincent Kessler (born November 16, 1955) is an American politician and former Democratic member of the West Virginia Senate in the United States, representing the 2nd district from 1997 to 2017. He is the former President of the Senate/Lieutenant Governor, Minority Leader of the Senate, Acting President of the Senate and Chairman of the Judiciary Committee. Kessler is also involved in private practice, where he is a partner in the law firm Berry, Kessler, Crutchfield, Taylor & Gordon.

Kessler was born November 16, 1955 in Wheeling, West Virginia. He is the son of George Henry Kessler (1924–2009) and Rosemary Krupica Kessler (1930–1978). He is a 1974 graduate of Bishop Donahue High School in McMechen, West Virginia. He also attended West Liberty State College (now West Liberty University) near Wheeling, West Virginia, and the West Virginia University College of Law in Morgantown, West Virginia.

Kessler unsuccessfully ran for the Democratic nomination in the 2011 gubernatorial election, losing to Earl Ray Tomblin, and in the 2016 gubernatorial election, losing to Jim Justice.

Biography
Jeff Kessler was born in 1955, he is of Russian descent on his mother's side. His father served in the US Navy during World War II and the Korean War, then later worked as a cookie salesman for Nabisco, he would bring home free samples and damaged cookies which Kessler enjoyed as a child. His mother stayed at home and took care of Jeff and his three siblings. Jeff's younger brother, Chris, was diagnosed with aplastic anemia when he was a toddler, he went into remission and survived. In 1994, Chris was elected Marshall County Assessor. Kessler's mother later died of breast cancer at the age of 47.

Positions

SCORE Initiative
In 2014, Kessler spearheaded the SCORE Initiative, which stands for Southern Coalfields Organizing and Revitalizing the Economy. The initiative aims to provide economic opportunities in areas which have suffered from job losses and economic hardships primarily due to losses in the coal industry. According to Kessler, the program acts as a counterpunch to the effects of the "war on coal" and aims to "change our way of thinking so that [Southern West Virginia] can once again become a region that offers our children and grandchildren opportunities for a better future."

Gun control
Kessler has previously voted in favor of a bill that eliminated the requirement for a permit and training before a person can carry a concealed weapon. He refers to himself as a "second amendment advocate."

Tobacco tax
In 2015, Kessler proposed raising the state cigarette tax by $1 per pack, stating that a $1 increase in the cigarette tax would bring in an estimated $130 million. Citing West Virginia's relatively high smoking rate, he has proposed setting aside $20 million of the new revenue for substance abuse programs; this move comes as part of a larger effort   He also hopes to set aside $10 million of the money for collegiate scholarships. The idea began to receive increased support in late 2015, with some newspaper boards citing the higher rates of neighboring states and comparing West Virginia's "arbitrarily low" rates to government subsidies for smokers.

References

External links
 West Virginia Legislature - Senator Jeff Kessler official government website
 Project Vote Smart - Senator Jeffrey V. Kessler (WV) profile
 Follow the Money - Jeff Kessler
 2008 2006 2004 2000 1998 Senate campaign contributions

1955 births
Living people
People from Glen Dale, West Virginia
Politicians from Wheeling, West Virginia
Presidents of the West Virginia State Senate
Democratic Party West Virginia state senators
West Liberty University alumni
West Virginia lawyers
West Virginia University College of Law alumni
21st-century American politicians
Lawyers from Wheeling, West Virginia